José Manuel Abundis Sandoval (born 11 June 1973) is a Mexican former professional footballer who played as a forward.

Career 
Abundis last played for Querétaro F.C. in 2008. He made his debut for the New England Revolution in Major League Soccer on 30 September 2006, scoring the second goal in a 3–1 victory against Columbus Crew SC, but was not re-signed at the end of the season, following disputes with coach Steve Nicol over playing time.

He represented Mexico at the 1996 Summer Olympics and the 1999 FIFA Confederations Cup. He scored 3 goals in the tournament, including one in the final.

Abundis served as head coach of Atlanta Silverbacks during the 2011 North American Soccer League season. He was fired by Atlanta on 7 November 2011.

On 18 June 2019. Abundis was appointed as head coach of Petroleros de Poza Rica, a team that plays in the Mexican Third Division.

Career statistics

International goals

Scores and results list Mexico's goal tally first.

Honours
Toluca
Mexican Primera División: Verano 1998, Verano 1999, Verano 2000, Apertura 2005

Mexico
FIFA Confederations Cup: 1999

References

External links 

1973 births
Living people
Mexico international footballers
1997 Copa América players
1997 FIFA Confederations Cup players
1999 FIFA Confederations Cup players
2000 CONCACAF Gold Cup players
2001 FIFA Confederations Cup players
FIFA Confederations Cup-winning players
Deportivo Toluca F.C. players
Atlante F.C. footballers
C.F. Monterrey players
C.F. Pachuca players
Querétaro F.C. footballers
New England Revolution players
Liga MX players
Footballers at the 1996 Summer Olympics
Olympic footballers of Mexico
Mexican emigrants to the United States
Footballers from Guadalajara, Jalisco
Atlanta Silverbacks coaches
Major League Soccer players
North American Soccer League coaches
Association football forwards
Mexican footballers
Mexican football managers